Antennolaelaps is a genus of mites in the family Ologamasidae.

Species
 Antennolaelaps affinis Womersley, 1956
 Antennolaelaps alveolaris Karg, 1993
 Antennolaelaps aremenae Lee, 1973
 Antennolaelaps brevisetae Karg, 1996
 Antennolaelaps celox Lee, 1973
 Antennolaelaps convexa (Womersley, 1956)
 Antennolaelaps heterosetae Karg, 1993
 Antennolaelaps testudo Lee, 1970

References

Ologamasidae